Kokomo-Center Township Consolidated School Corporation is located in Kokomo, Indiana and is Howard County's largest school district.

Administration 
Jeff Hauswald, Superintendent
Pennye Siefert, Assistant Superintendent

Building directory 
Bon Air Elementary
Boulevard Elementary
Darrough Chapel Early Learning Center
Elwood Haynes Elementary
Lafayette Park Elementary
Pettit Park Elementary
Sycamore International  Elementary
Wallace Elementary School of Integrated Arts
Central Middle School (former Kokomo High School)
Bon Air Middle School
Maple Crest Middle School
McKinley Alternative School
Kokomo High School (former Haworth High School)
Kokomo Area Career Center

External links 
Kokomo School Corporation

School districts in Indiana
Education in Howard County, Indiana
Kokomo, Indiana